"On Sitting Down to Read King Lear Once Again" is a short sonnet by John Keats.

Composition 
The poem was composed in 1818, written in the margin of a replica of Shakespeare's works, and published posthumously on November 8, 1838 in The Plymouth and Devenport Weekly Journal. In a letter from January 23, 1818, Keats writes, "I sat down yesterday to read King Lear once again; the thing appeared to demand the prologue of a sonnet".

Poem

Structure 
The poem has a rhyme scheme of ABBA ABBA CDCD EE and is fourteen lines long.

Response 
It is arguable that King Lear was the most significant Shakespearean play for Keats, and it inspired him to move on from Endymion to begin working on Hyperion, which he said would be written in "a more naked and Grecian manner". Other scholars have argued that "On Sitting Down to Read King Lear Once Again" acts as one of Keats' 'review' poems - written in response to the burgeoning group of literary critics of the day, therefore placing it alongside poems like On First Looking into Chapman's Homer. Others argue that the sonnet's position as a prologue places Keats in collaboration with Shakespeare, and that the poem indicates Keats' status as an active reader.

See also 

 John Keats bibliography

Sources

External links
 

Poetry by John Keats
Sonnets